Justice Brady may refer to:

Edward Thomas Brady (fl. 1960s–2010s), associate justice of the North Carolina Supreme Court
Thomas Pickens Brady (1903–1973), associate justice of the Mississippi Supreme Court

See also
Judge Brady (disambiguation)